The Baie de Douarnenez is a bay in Finistère, France, between the Crozon Peninsula to the north and the Cap Sizun to the south. To the south-east is the port of Douarnenez, which was the center of a large sardine industry in the early 20th century. The bay was named after it. Dourarnenez is the only settlement of importance on the banks of the bay. The bathing station at Morgat is located to the north, on the Crozon peninsula.

The mythical town of Ys, which legend says was engulfed by the ocean, is commonly said to be located in this bay.

References

Geography of Brest, France
Douarnenez